A Europe Street (also Little Europe or Europetown) is a type of shopping area in China where European culture is on display.

Examples include:
Chengdu's Tongzilin (桐梓林) neighborhood  While officially called "Tongzilin European Culture Street", a source claims that Chengdu's Tongzilin European Culture Street is "... is in European style with European architecture, pools, and porches. Road signs of this street are written in four languages: Chinese, English, Japanese and Korean."
 Yancheng as of July 2010
 Hefei, called the "Hefei Economic and Technological Development Zone", which is north of Pearl Plaza, is a "... creative mix of European streetscape, merged into a distinctive European style buildings."
 Huai'an, known as "Huai'an Square" is a "key municipal project" that is "... located in Huaian Huaihai Road No. 65."  The place is described as a "... European and American classic fashion apparel and merchandise with the characteristics of leisure travel."
 Shenzhen's "Europe Town Shenzhen", which is located in the Nanshan district.
 Luodian, Shanghai, is known as the "North European New Town"

Beijing had a two-day festival in 2005 named "Europe Street", located in Firework Square near Chaoyang Park. It was organised by a delegation from the European Commission of the European Union, celebrating the 30th anniversary of EU-China diplomatic relations. The event had music and street theatre performances drawn from many EU countries.

See also 

 Jackson Hole, China
Thames Town
Ju Jun - known as "Orange County, China"
 Africans in Guangzhou
 Hallstatt (China)
 Qidong Old Quebec

References 

Shops in China